Musabayev or Musabaev is a Turkic masculine surname, its feminine counterpart is Musabayeva or Musabaeva. Notable people with the surname include:

Talgat Musabayev (born 1951), Kazakh test pilot and former cosmonaut 
Zafarjon Musabayev (born 1975), Uzbekistani footballer

Turkic-language surnames